The PowerTrike Evolution is a German ultralight trike, designed and produced by PowerTrike of Mackenbach. The aircraft is supplied as a complete ready-to-fly-aircraft.

As of 2014 the design is no longer indicated as available on the company website.

Design and development
The Evolution was designed to comply with the Fédération Aéronautique Internationale microlight category. It features a cable-braced hang glider-style high-wing, weight-shift controls, a two-seats-in-tandem open cockpit with an integral cockpit fairing, tricycle landing gear with wheel pants and a single engine in pusher configuration.

The aircraft is made from composites, with its double surface wing covered in Dacron sailcloth and supported by a composite monopole pylon. Its  span wing is supported by a single tube-type kingpost and uses an "A" frame weight-shift control bar. The powerplant is a twin cylinder, liquid-cooled, two-stroke, dual-ignition  Rotax 582 engine. The main wheel suspension is provided by fibreglass gear legs.

The aircraft is German DULV certified.

Operational history
The Evolution has been flown to World Microlight Championships and also European Microlight Championship honours.

Specifications (Evolution)

References

External links

2000s German sport aircraft
2000s German ultralight aircraft
Single-engined pusher aircraft
Ultralight trikes